Bat Masterson is an American Western television series which was a fictionalized account of the life of real-life marshal/gambler/dandy Bat Masterson. The title character was played by Gene Barry, and the half-hour black-and-white series ran on NBC from 1958 to 1961. The show was produced by Ziv Television Productions. "Bat" is a nickname for Masterson's first name, Bartholemew, although in both the 1958 pilot "Double Showdown" and 1961 episode "No Amnesty For Death", he says his name is William Barkley Masterson.

Although the series was fiction, it claimed in the closing credits to be based on the biography Bat Masterson, by Richard O'Connor.

Overview
Barry's Masterson often dressed in expensive Eastern clothing and preferred to use his cane rather than a gun to get himself out of trouble. Masterson was also portrayed as a ladies' man who traveled the West looking for women and adventure. Born Eugene Klass, actor Gene Barry had changed his last name as a tribute to actor John Barrymore.

The black derby, fancy decorative vest, black jacket, and elegant gold-topped cane were his trademarks. Miniaturized toy versions were marketed to children as tie-in products during the run of the series.  When dressed more casually in episodes centered on outdoor action, Masterson would sometimes wear an identical but gray derby in place of the black one. After the turn of the century, the real-life Bat Masterson became a prominent writer of Western reminiscences as well as a flamboyant New York City newspaper journalist and close friend of Damon Runyon, and was the inspiration for the character "Sky Masterson" in Runyon's Guys and Dolls, portrayed by Marlon Brando in a theatrical film three years before the television series began.

Cast

Main cast
 Gene Barry as Bat Masterson (108 episodes)
 Allison Hayes as Ellie Winters (7 episodes)
 Allen Jaffe as belligerent drunk (7 episodes)
 Ken Drake as Burdette (6 episodes)
 Troy Melton as government agent (6 episodes)

Guest cast
Bat Masterson guest stars included the character actor Robert F. Simon, who appeared as Harrison Whitney in the episode "Death by Decree", and Richard Eastham, who appeared in the 1961 episode "A Lesson in Violence". Stefanie Powers appeared in the 1961 episode named "Dead Man's Claim" (using the name Taffy Paul) as Ann, the niece of the boarding house owner. George Macready appeared as Clyde Richards in the 1961 episode "Tempest at Tioga Pass". Quentin Sondergaard appeared in various roles on the series five times between 1958 and 1961. Dan Sheridan was cast as Joe Rankin in the 1959 episode "Election Day". The lovely Allison Hayes had a recurring role as card dealer Ellie Winters in 7 episodes.

Yvonne Lime Fedderson was cast as Lola White in the 1960 episode "The Snare". Ron Hayes appeared four times in the role of Wyatt Earp. Gary Vinson appeared as Billy Thompson in the 1958 episode "A Noose Fits Anybody". Tyler McVey appeared from 1958 to 1961 in different roles in three episodes ("Dynamite Blows Two Ways", "Incident at Fort Bowie", and "Dead Man's Claim"). Ron Foster (1960) appeared twice as Toby Dawson in "Six Feet of Gold" and as Sheriff Buck Simpson in "Jeopardy at Jackson Hole" (1961). James Coburn also appeared in "Six Feet of Gold". Tom Greenway guest starred twice, as Charlie in "Buffalo Kill" (1959) and as Ben Pick in "Dagger Dance" (1961). Brett King appeared four times, beginning with the role of Hub Elliott in "License to Cheat" (1959); Douglas Kennedy was cast as Sheriff Jeb Crater in that same episode. William Tannen was cast in four episodes of Bat Masterson.

Diane Brewster, also known as "Beaver" Cleaver's second-grade teacher "Miss Canfield" in Leave It to Beaver and as gambler "Samantha Crawford" opposite James Garner in  Maverick, played the role of Miss Lynn Harrison in the 2-part episode "The Conspiracy" (1959). Kevin Hagen appeared as Ace Williams in "The Fourth Man" (1961). Lon Chaney Jr. played the role of Rance Fletcher in "Bat Trap" (1961). Patrick Waltz, Ray Kellogg and Marie Windsor had guest-starred in the episode "The Fighter". Donald Murphy made one appearance in 1960. Anna Navarro and George Sawaya both made one appearance in 1961.

Production

Development
The series was loosely based on Richard O'Connor's 1957 biography of Masterson. This was highlighted by the book's front cover being shown at the end of the closing credits with an onscreen notation "based on".

From 1955 to 1959, Mason Alan Dinehart played a 20-something Bat Masterson in thirty-four episodes of the ABC/Desilu western series, The Life and Legend of Wyatt Earp, starring Hugh O'Brian as the frontier peace officer Wyatt Earp. Dinehart left the series, and Barry was cast as a 40-something Masterson in a separate series on a different network. In the year 1958-1959 both actors were featured in the role of Masterson. The 1991 television film The Gambler Returns: The Luck of the Draw featured both Barry as Masterson and O'Brian as Earp in a supporting cast peppered with such cameos.

According to BMI and the sheet music, the theme music was written by Havens Wray (although incorrectly spelled by BMI as Ravens Wray). However it was likely written by David Rose, an ASCAP member who couldn't use his own name for a BMI composition. The words were by BMI writer Bart Corwin. The theme song was sung by Bill Lee, a member of the Mellomen.

Episodes
The series consisted of three seasons and 108 episodes:

Season 1 (1958-1959)

Season 2 (1959-1960)

Season 3 (1960-1961)

Spin-offs and remakes

Guns of Paradise (1990)
Barry recreated the role of Bat Masterson in an episode of the television series Guns of Paradise (1990), alongside Hugh O'Brian as Wyatt Earp.

The Gambler Returns: The Luck of the Draw (1991)
In The Gambler Returns: The Luck of the Draw (1991) Barry played Masterson, also with O'Brian as Earp, as well as Jack Kelly as Bart Maverick and Clint Walker as Cheyenne Bodie.

Home media
TGG Direct released the first and second seasons on DVD in Region 1 on January 29, 2013.  The third and final season was released on November 5, 2013.  Due to licensing issues, the episode Terror on the Trinity is not included.

In other media

Comic book
Dell Comics issued nine issues of a quarterly Bat Masterson comic book between Aug./Oct. 1959 and Nov. 1961/Jan. 1962 with the initial issue a Four Color tryout (#1013).

Comic Strip
Columbia Features syndicated a comic strip from September 7, 1959 to April 1960 written by Ed Herron and drawn by Howard Nostrand (Sept. 1959–Dec. 1959) and Bob Powell (Dec. 1959–April 1960). Nostrand was assisted (on backgrounds) by Neal Adams who had just graduated from the School of Industrial Arts; it was among his first professional art jobs.

References

External links

 
  Gene Barry Fan Page

NBC original programming
1958 American television series debuts
1961 American television series endings
Cultural depictions of Bat Masterson
1950s Western (genre) television series
Television series based on actual events
Television series based on books
Television series by MGM Television
Black-and-white American television shows
Television shows adapted into comics
Western (genre) television series featuring gimmick weapons
1960s Western (genre) television series